The Reza Abbasi Museum (Persian: موزه رضا عباسی ) is a museum in Tehran, Iran. It is located in Seyed Khandan. The museum is named after Reza Abbasi, one of the artists in the Safavid period. The Reza Abbasi Museum is home to a unique collection of Persian art dating back to the second millennium BC, from both the pre-Islamic and Islamic eras.

History
Reza Abbasi Museum was officially opened in September 1977 under the guidance of Queen Farah Pahlavi, but it was closed in November 1978. It was reopened a year later in 1979, with some changes in its internal decorations and further expansion of its exhibition space. It was closed again in 1984 due to some internal difficulties and reopened a year later. It was finally opened for the fifth time, after its renovation on February 4, 2000. Currently Reza Abbasi Museum is administrated by Cultural Heritage Organization of Iran.

Collections
The collections of this museum belong to a period from the 7nd millennium BC to the early 20th century.  The displays are set according to time interval. There are many objects exhibited in this museum such as artifacts made of baked clay, metal and stone from the pre historic times to pottery and metal objects, textile and lacquer painting, manuscripts and jewelry belonging to the Islamic period.

Library
There are over 10,000 Persian, English, French and German books about Persian art, history, archaeology and classical paintings in this museum.

Publication department
The publication department has published many books regarding Iranian arts and collections.

Training courses
There are also different training courses in the museum such as Drawing, Calligraphy, Watercolor and Oil painting.

Burning the documents
In May 2015 various documents of the museum which were mostly communications with Queen Farah Diba's office before 1979 Islamic Revolution were burned. The issue was revealed by Mehr News Agency in Tehran and created a lot of criticism in Persian-language media and social networks.

The collection of silver coins

References

Museums established in 1977
Museums in Tehran
National museums of Iran
Museums of Ancient Near East in Asia
Art museums and galleries in Iran